Ridgway Armory is a historic National Guard armory located at Ridgway, Elk County, Pennsylvania.  It was built in 1904, and is a -story, rectangular brick building in the Romanesque Revival style. The drill hall is located on the second floor, above the administration area.

It was added to the National Register of Historic Places in 1989.

The building has since been unused and is largely vacant. It has had renovations to upkeep the wall on the right side of the building to avoid collapsing into the river. It is adjacent to a YMCA which is built in a similar style.

References

Armories on the National Register of Historic Places in Pennsylvania
Romanesque Revival architecture in Pennsylvania
Infrastructure completed in 1904
Buildings and structures in Elk County, Pennsylvania
National Register of Historic Places in Elk County, Pennsylvania